Brian Honan (April 2, 1963 - July 30, 2002) was the Democratic city councilman representing the neighborhoods of Allston and Brighton.

Personal life
He graduated from St. Columbkille High School, Boston College and the New England School of Law.

Honan died four days after surgery at Brigham and Women's Hospital in Boston.  The surgery was to remove a cancerous tumor in his bile duct.  At the time of his death, he was running to become the District Attorney in Suffolk County, Massachusetts. His brother, State Representative Kevin Honan, delivered the eulogy.

Legacy
The Brian J. Honan Charitable Fund sponsors an annual 5K road race. The Allston branch of the Boston Public Library is named after him.

The Allston Brighton Community Development Corporation sponsored Brian J. Honan Apartments are also named after him.

References

2002 deaths
Boston City Council members
Massachusetts Democrats
Boston College alumni
New England Law Boston alumni
People from Allston–Brighton
1963 births
Deaths from cancer in Massachusetts
Deaths from cholangiocarcinoma
20th-century American politicians